The Shadow Ministry of Gough Whitlam was the opposition Australian Labor Party frontbench of Australia from 8 February 1967 to 5 December 1972, opposing the Liberal-Country Coalition government.

Gough Whitlam became Leader of the Opposition upon his election as leader of the Australian Labor Party on 9 February 1967, and headed up the Australian Labor Party Caucus Executive until 1969. Following their loss at the 1969 election, the Labor Party adopted a Shadow Cabinet system. The shadow cabinet is a group of senior Opposition spokespeople who form an alternative Cabinet to the government's, whose members shadow or mark each individual Minister or portfolio of the Government.

Caucus Executive (1967-1969)
The following were members of the ALP Caucus Executive from 8 February 1967 to 12 November 1969:
 Gough Whitlam   - Leader of the Opposition and Leader of the Labor Party
 Lance Barnard  - Deputy Leader of the Opposition and Deputy Leader of the Labor Party
 Senator Lionel Murphy  - Leader of the Opposition in the Senate
 Senator Samuel Cohen (to 7 October 1969) - Deputy Leader of the Opposition in the Senate
 Noel Beaton  (to 9 April 1969)
 Jim Cairns 
 Clyde Cameron 
 Rex Connor 
 Frank Crean 
 Fred Daly 
 Charles Jones 
 Tony Luchetti 
 Rex Patterson 
 Harry Webb

Shadow Ministry (1969-1972)
The following were members of the Shadow Cabinet from 12 November 1969 to 5 December 1972:

See also
 First Whitlam ministry (interim)
 Second Whitlam ministry
 Second Holt Ministry
 McEwen Ministry
 First Gorton Ministry
 Second Gorton Ministry
 McMahon Ministry

References

Australian Labor Party
Whitlam I
Opposition of Australia